Cachita may refer to:

Cachita (song) by Rafael Hernández
La Cachita, popular nickname of Our Lady of Charity, patroness of Cuba
Alina María Hernández (1970 – 2016), Cuban transgender television actress
Cachita Galán (1943 - 2004), Argentine singer
Zosne cachita, species of beetle

See also 
Cachito (disambiguation)